This is a list of notable actors from Denmark.

A

Karl Gustav Ahlefeldt
Jens Albinus
Gwili Andre
Christian Arhoff

B

Vivi Bach
Aage Bendixen
Anders Bircow
Rasmus Bjerg
Oliver Bjerrehuus
Carsten Bjørnlund
Anna Bloch
Kim Bodnia
Lars Bom
Klaus Bondam
Beatrice Bonnesen
Anna Borg
Frederik Buch 
Hans Egede Budtz
Poul Bundgaard
Zlatko Buric

C

Jakob Cedergren
Jesper Christensen
Nikolaj Coster-Waldau

D

Trine Dyrholm

E

Giancarlo Esposito

F

Olaf Fønss
Mikkel Boe Følsgaard

G

Morten Grunwald
Sofie Gråbøl

H

John Hahn-Petersen
Caroline Halle-Müller
Holger Juul Hansen
Anne Louise Hassing
Johanne Luise Heiberg
Mimi Heinrich
Bjarne Henriksen
Iben Hjejle
Astrid Holm
Pelle Hvenegaard
Allan Hyde

J

Ann Eleonora Jorgensen

K

Katja K
Nikolaj Lie Kaas
Kristian Kiehling
Jesper Klein
Sidse Babett Knudsen
Kim Kold
Brigitte Kolerus
Svend Kornbeck
Simon Kvamm
Helene Kvint

L

Thomas Bo Larsen
Viggo Larsen
 Augusta Lütken (1855–1910), opera singer

M

Harald Madsen
Preben Mahrt
Peter Malberg
Osa Massen
Anders Matthesen
Svend Melsing
Cyron Melville
Svend Methling
Helle Michaelsen
Lars Mikkelsen
Mads Mikkelsen
Viggo Mortensen
Ib Mossin

N

Sigrid Neiiendam (1873–1955), actress
Birthe Neumann
Asta Nielsen
Brigitte Nielsen
Connie Nielsen
Peter Nielsen
Carsten Norgaard
Ghita Nørby

O

Kirsten Olesen (born 1949), stage, film and TV actress

P

Dirch Passer
 Johanne Pedersen-Dan (1860–1934), actress and operetta singer
Ulf Pilgaard
Søren Pilmark
Olaf Pooley
Valdemar Psilander

Q

Berthe Qvistgaard

R

Lars Ranthe
Rie Rasmussen
Aage Redal
Poul Reichhardt
Kirsten Rolffes

S

Carl Schenstrøm
Ib Schønberg
Clara Schønfeld 
Ann Smyrner
Ingeborg Spangsfeldt
Jens Jørn Spottag
Ove Sprogøe
Karl Stegger
Yutte Stensgaard
Annette Stroyberg

T

Ulrich Thomsen
Sven-Ole Thorsen

U

Ella Ungermann (1891–1921)
Emilie Ullerup

V

Annette Vadim
Valda Valkyrien
Merete Van Kamp

W

Charlotte Wiehe-Berény
Viggo Wiehe
Carlo Wieth
Aage Winther-Jørgensen
Susse Wold

See also

List of Danes
Lists of actors

Lists of actors by nationality

Actors